Patricia Ross (born 8 March 1959 in Middlebury, Vermont) is an American former cross-country skier who competed from 1982 to 1984. She attended the University of New Hampshire and skied for the 'Cats. She graduated in 1982 with a degree in physical education.

Ross finished seventh in the 4 × 5 km relay at the 1984 Winter Olympics in Sarajevo.

After retiring, she became a real estate broker in upstate New York.

Cross-country skiing results

Olympic Games

World Cup

Season standings

References

1959 births
Living people
American female cross-country skiers
Cross-country skiers at the 1984 Winter Olympics
Olympic cross-country skiers of the United States
Sportspeople from Vermont
People from Middlebury, Vermont
21st-century American women